Eureka often refers to:

 Eureka (word), a famous exclamation attributed to Archimedes
 Eureka effect, the sudden, unexpected realization of the solution to a problem

Eureka may also refer to:

History 
 Eureka Rebellion, an 1854 goldminers' rebellion in Ballarat, Victoria, Australia
 Eureka Flag, the battle flag of the Eureka Rebellion
 Tehran Conference, codenamed Eureka, an Allied meeting during World War II

Businesses
 Eureka (company), a manufacturer of vacuum cleaners
 Eureka! Restaurant Group, California-based hamburger restaurant chain
 Eureka! Tent Company, an American company
 Kværner Eureka, a Norwegian engineering and construction services company

Media and entertainment

Characters
 Eureka O'Hara, an American drag queen, popularized on Rupaul's Drag Race
 Eureka (Oz), Dorothy Gale's cat in The Wizard of Oz, so named because Uncle Henry found her
 Eureka (Eureka Seven), a main character in Eureka Seven

Film and television
 Eureka (1983 film), a British-American drama directed by Nicolas Roeg
 Eureka (2000 film), a Japanese drama directed by Shinji Aoyama
 Eureka! (TV series), a 1980s Canadian educational series
 Eureka! (2022 TV series), a 2020s American educational series
 Eureka (UK TV series), a 1980s British educational series
 Eureka (U.S. TV series), an American science fiction series aired 2006–2012
 Eureka (soundtrack), a 2008 soundtrack album
 Eureka TV, a British children's science show aired 2001–2005

Music
 Eureka (Jim O'Rourke album), whose title track was featured in the 2000 film
 Eureka (Mother Mother album)
 Eureka (Rooney album), 2010
 Eureka (Leslie Clio album)
 "Eureka" (song), 2014 song by Sakanaction

Literature
 Eureka (University of Cambridge magazine), published by the Cambridge University Mathematical Society
 Eureka (Italian magazine), a monthly comic magazine published between 1967 and 1989
 Eureka: A Prose Poem, a 1848 essay by Edgar Allan Poe
 Eureka, a monthly science magazine for primary school students in Malayalam language published by Kerala Sasthra Sahithya Parishad, Kerala, India
  Eureka (journal), the original name of the Canadian mathematical problem-solving journal Crux Mathematicorum

Other media
 Eureka (musical), a 2004 Australian musical
 Eureka! (video game), a 1984 text adventure

Places

Australia 

 Eureka, New South Wales, a suburb in Byron Shire
 Eureka, Queensland, a locality in the Bundaberg Region
 Eureka, Victoria, a small eastern suburb of Ballarat

Canada 

 Eureka, Nova Scotia
 Eureka, Nunavut
 Eureka Pass, Axel Heiberg Island, Nunavut
 Eureka Sound, Nunavut

New Zealand 
 Eureka, New Zealand, rural settlement in the Waikato District

United States 
 Eureka, California, the largest US city named Eureka
 Eureka, Colorado
 Eureka, Marion County, Florida
 Eureka, Miami-Dade County, Florida, part of Richmond West, Florida
 Eureka, Illinois
 Eureka College
 Eureka, Lawrence County, Indiana, an unincorporated community
 Eureka, Spencer County, Indiana, an unincorporated community
 Eureka, Kansas
 Eureka, Michigan, an unincorporated community
 Eureka, Missouri
 Eureka, Perry County, Missouri
 Eureka, Montana
 Eureka, Nevada
 Eureka, North Carolina
 Eureka, Pennsylvania
 Eureka, South Carolina, an unincorporated community in Aiken County, South Carolina
 Eureka, South Dakota
 Eureka, Texas (disambiguation)
 Eureka, Utah
 Eureka (Baskerville, Virginia), a historic home near Baskerville, Mecklenburg County, Virginia
 Eureka, Washington
 Eureka, West Virginia
 Eureka, Polk County, Wisconsin, a town
 Eureka, Winnebago County, Wisconsin, an unincorporated community
 Eureka Center, Minnesota
 Eureka Center, Wisconsin
 Eureka County, Nevada
 Eureka Springs, Arkansas
 Eureka Township, Adair County, Iowa
 Eureka Township, Michigan
 Eureka Township, Dakota County, Minnesota
 Eureka Township, Valley County, Nebraska
 Eureka Valley (Inyo County), California
 Eureka Valley, San Francisco, California

Science and technology 
 Eureka (organisation), an international research and development funding and coordination network 
 Eureka (OPAC), a library search engine developed by RLG
 Eureka! (museum), a museum in Halifax, West Yorkshire, United Kingdom
 The Eureka, a machine for generating Latin verses
 Eureka-147, a system for digital audio broadcast
 Eureka Streams, an open source software project
 Eureka theorem, a result of Gauss that every natural number is the sum of three triangular numbers
 5261 Eureka, an asteroid co-orbital with Mars
 Constantan, also known as Eureka, a metal alloy
 Heureka, a science centre in Vantaa, Finland
 Eureka, the transponder component of the World War II Rebecca/Eureka transponding radar
 Eureka: The Solver, numerical solver for mathematical systems of equations, released by Borland, 1987

Transportation 
 Eureka (1900 automobile), an American automobile
 Eureka (1907 automobile), an American automobile
 Eureka (airship), a Zeppelin NT owned by Airship Ventures
 Eureka (French automobile), a French automobile
 Eureka (ferryboat), an 1890-built steam ferryboat now preserved in San Francisco
 Ameri-Cana Eureka, a Canadian ultralight aircraft

Other uses
 Eureka Diamond, the first diamond found in South Africa
 Eureka Prizes, annual Australian science prizes presented by the Australian Museum, Sydney, Australia
 Eureka Shipyard, a shipyard of the early 20th century in New York State
 Eureka Tower, a 2006 91-storey residential building in Melbourne, Australia
 Disney's Eureka! A California Parade, a former parade in Disney's California Adventure Park
 Eureka! Program, a teen girls' achievement program run by Girls, Inc.
 Asociación Atlética Eureka, known as Eureka, a former football team in Argentina
 Eureka O'Hara, American drag queen

See also
 EURECA (disambiguation)